Karl Theodor Grau (1884–1952) was an Estonian lawyer and politician.

Grau was born on 31 October 1884 in Soosaare Parish (now Viljandi Parish) in Kreis Fellin and practised as a lawyer. He was elected to the Estonian Provincial Assembly, which governed the Autonomous Governorate of Estonia between 1917 and 1919; he served for the whole term, but did not sit in the newly formed Republic of Estonia's Asutav Kogu (Constituent Assembly) or the Riigikogu. He died on 18 August 1952 in Augsburg, West Germany.

References 

1884 births
1952 deaths
People from Viljandi Parish
People from Kreis Fellin
Members of the Estonian Provincial Assembly
20th-century Estonian lawyers
Estonian emigrants to Germany